Anopheles minimus is a species of mosquito can be found around Oriental region included: India, Myanmar, Thailand, Laos, Cambodia, Vietnam, Southern China comprising Hong Kong, Taiwan and the Ryukyu Islands of Japan.It was the main vector of malaria.

Hosts
Hosts include Bos taurus and Bubalus bubalis.

References

minimus
Insects described in 1901